Mountain with Red House is a 1913 painting (landscape art) by Charles Demuth. It is in the collection of the Metropolitan Museum of Art.

Early history and creation
Charles Demuth painted this work around 1913, perhaps while he developed his craft in Paris traveled across France. He likely held onto this painting until he gave it to his friend Georgia O'Keeffe in 1931.

Description and interpretation
The work depicts two small houses in the foreground with a mountain range in the background. On the reverse side, there is a watercolor draft of a bridge over the Seine in Paris.

References

Paintings in the collection of the Metropolitan Museum of Art
1913 paintings
Paintings by Charles Demuth